Else Baum was an Austrian film editor active from 1930 to 1940.

Selected filmography 

 Zwielicht (1940)
 Ein Mädchen geht an Land (1938)
 Schatten der Vergangenheit (1936)
 Der König lächelt – Paris lacht (1936)
 The White Horse Inn (1935) 
 ...nur ein Komödiant (1935)
 Die ewige Maske (1935) 
 Lockspitzel Asew (1935) 
 The Cousin from Nowhere (1934) 
 Shock Troop (1934)
 Gruß und Kuß – Veronika (1933) 
 Two Good Comrades (1933) 
 There Is Only One Love (1933)
 Sehnsucht 202 (1932) 
 The Company's in Love (1932)
 Reserve hat Ruh (1931) 
 Victoria and Her Hussar (1931) 
 Geld auf der Straße (1930) 
 Die Lindenwirtin (1930)

References 

Austrian film editors
Women film editors